Horace Vincent Henshall (14 June 1889 – 7 December 1951) was an English football outside left who went on to make his name as a manager.

Playing career
Henshall appeared in non-league football for Bridgetown Amateurs and Crewe Alexandra before joining the Football League with Aston Villa in 1910. He subsequently played the bulk of his football with Notts County whom he joined for a then club record fee in 1912. He made 164 league appearances for the club, although his career was inevitably interrupted by the First World War.

Henshall signed for Sheffield Wednesday in December 1922 and remained at the club until the following March, making 14 league appearances with three in the FA Cup. He finished his league career at Chesterfield where he was one of a number of veterans favoured by manager Harry Parkes at the time.

Management career
Henshall was manager of Lincoln City from May 1924 to June 1927, guiding the club through a period of financial austerity. He returned to Notts County in June 1927, succeeding Albert Fisher as Secretary Manager, and remained with the club until May 1934.

After leaving Notts Henshall remained in Nottingham, serving as landlord of the Navigation Inn near the club's Meadow Lane ground.

References

External links
 

1889 births
1951 deaths
English footballers
English Football League players
Crewe Alexandra F.C. players
Aston Villa F.C. players
Notts County F.C. players
Sheffield Wednesday F.C. players
Chesterfield F.C. players
English football managers
Lincoln City F.C. managers
Notts County F.C. managers
People from Hednesford
English Football League representative players
Association football outside forwards